Saint Lucia competed at the 2020 Summer Olympics in Tokyo, Japan. Originally scheduled to take place from 24 July to 9 August 2020, the Games were postponed to 23 July to 8 August 2021, because of the COVID-19 pandemic. It was the nation's seventh consecutive appearance at the Summer Olympics. The nation was seeking its first Olympic medal; Levern Spencer's 6th-place finish in the 2016 high jump was Saint Lucia's best result to date at the time of this Olympics.

The country's planning for the 2020 Games began shortly after the conclusion of the 2016 Summer Olympics, with Saint Lucia Olympic Committee president Fortuna Belrose noting that some athletes had already expressed interest and submitted programmes. Saint Lucia's Olympic hopefuls include Spencer (who would be a four-time Olympian), Jeanelle Scheper (a 2016 Olympian), Albert Reynolds, Sandisha Antoine, and Julien Alfred. The COVID-19 pandemic has affected preparations, training, and qualification efforts; Belrose and the SLOC have committed to supporting athletes in qualifying for the postponed Games.

Competitors
The following is the list of number of competitors in the Games.

Athletics

Saint Lucian athletes further achieved the entry standards, either by qualifying time or by world ranking, in the following track and field events (up to a maximum of 3 athletes in each event):

Field events

Sailing

Saint Lucia received an invitation from the Tripartite Commission to send sailors competing in the men's Laser and women's Laser Radial to the Olympic regatta.

M = Medal race; EL = Eliminated – did not advance into the medal race

Swimming

Saint Lucia received a universality invitation from FINA to send two top-ranked swimmers (one per gender) in their respective individual events to the Olympics, based on the FINA Points System of June 28, 2021.

See also
Saint Lucia at the 2019 Pan American Games

References

Nations at the 2020 Summer Olympics
Saint Lucia at the Summer Olympics by year
2020 in Saint Lucian sport